A bicycle is a two-wheeled, pedal-driven vehicle.

Bicycle or bicycles may also refer to:

 Bicycle (graph theory), a minimal graph that is not a pseudoforest
 An ace-to-five straight, a type of poker hand
 Bicycle crunch, an abdominal exercise
 Bicycle kick, a way of kicking a ball in various sports
 Bicycle Playing Cards, a brand of the United States Playing Card Company
 Bicycle (documentary), a 2014 documentary film about the history and culture of the bicycle in Great Britain.

Music
 The Bicycles, a Canadian band
Bicycle (song), Korean song
"Bicycle Race", sometimes called "Bicycle", song by Queen
 "Bicycle",  a song by the Nico Touches the Walls from the album Humania
 "Bicycle", a song by Unknown Mortal Orchestra from the album Unknown Mortal Orchestra

See also

 Bi (disambiguation)
 Bcycle (disambiguation)
 Bicyclic
 
 Bike (disambiguation)
 Cycle (disambiguation)